Pobblebonk may refer to:
Limnodynastes dorsalis, a frog found in Southwest Australia
Limnodynastes dumerilii, found in Eastern Australia

and may also refer to:
Scarlet-sided pobblebonk, Limnodynastes terraereginae

Animal common name disambiguation pages